Torodora vietnamensis is a moth in the family Lecithoceridae described by Kyu-Tek Park in 2007. It is found in northern Vietnam.

The wingspan is 19–20 mm. The ground colour of the forewings is shiny, golden brown, often with a yellowish triangular or elongate patch before the tornus on the inner margin. The hindwings are pale yellowish brown.

Etymology
The specific name is derived from the country of the type locality.

References

Torodora
Moths of Asia
Moths described in 2007